Volume 2 is the second album by punk band Reagan Youth.  The group began working on the record after its decision to disband, and its songs represent material written throughout the band's ten-year initial career.  As bassist Victor Dominicis left the band early in the album's recording sessions with an unsatisfactory performance, guitarist Paul Bakija plays both guitar and bass on the record.

Track listing 
 "It's a Beautiful Day" – 3:53   
 "Jesus Was a Communist" – 1:44   
 "Urban Savages" – 1:23   
 "What Will the Neighbors Think?" – 3:50   
 "Get the Ruler Out" – 2:25   
 "Brave New World" – 4:30   
 "Miss Teen America" – 2:46   
 "Heavy Metal Shuffle" – 4:38   
 "Queen Babylon" – 5:12   
 "Acid Rain" – 1:55   
 "One Holy Bible" – 6:12   
 "Back to the Garden (parts 1-1V)" (Instrumental) – 4:05

Personnel 
 "Dave Insurgent" (Dave Rubinstein) - Vocals
 "Paul Cripple" (Paul Bakija) - Guitar/Bass
 "Johnny Aztec" (Javier Madariaga) - Drums
 Jimmy "the Greek" Fourniadis - Engineer
 Mixed and Produced - Reagan Youth

1990 albums
Reagan Youth albums
Sequel albums